Majdabad (also Romanized as Majdābād) is a village in Sefiddasht Rural District, in the Central District of Aran va Bidgol County, Isfahan Province, Iran. At the 2006 census, its population was 14, in 5 families.

References 

Populated places in Aran va Bidgol County